Emam Verdi (also Romanized as Emām Verdī; also known as Qūzleq) is a village in Aladagh Rural District, in the Central District of Bojnord County, North Khorasan Province, Iran. At the 2006 census, its population was 178, in 50 families.

References 

Populated places in Bojnord County